Love's Influence is a 1922 British silent drama film directed by William S. Charlton and Edward Gordon and starring George K. Arthur, Flora le Breton and Simeon Stuart.

Cast
 George K. Arthur as Johnny O'Hara  
 Flora le Breton as June  
 Simeon Stuart 
 Bertie White 
 George Turner 
 Doris Lloyd 
 William Lugg 
 Marie Gerald

References

Bibliography
 Denis Gifford. The Illustrated Who's Who in British Films. B.T. Batsford, 1978.

External links
 

1922 films
1922 drama films
British drama films
British silent feature films
British black-and-white films
1920s English-language films
1920s British films
Silent drama films